Jula (born Julita Ratowska, primo voto Julita Fabiszewska, 3 March 1991 in Łomża) is a Polish singer and songwriter. Known for her hits "Za każdym razem", "Nie zatrzymasz mnie" and "Kiedyś odnajdziemy siebie". Her debut album, Na krawędzi was released August 14, 2012.

Career
She gained popularity due to her amateur musical recordings published on the internet. "Za każdym razem" was recorded at home, gained more than a million viewers. The professionally recorded single music was composed by Adi Owsianik, leader of Rotten Bark.

In 2012, Jula was awarded from the radio listeners of RMF MAXXX, at the festival TOPtrendy 2012 Trends in concert. On 2 June of the same year with the song "Za każdym razem" she performed at the concert Prime Minister on 49th Festival of Opole in Opole. On July 20, 2012, during a live at the Eska Music Awards 2012 she was awarded for the Best New Artist and Best Artist ESKA.pl. On August 14 of the same year by My Music, she released her debut album Na krawędzi. In 2013 the singer was nominated for Kids' Choice Awards 2013.

Participation in Bitwa na głosy
In July 2012, Jula officially confirmed her participation in the third edition of the Bitwa na głosy, in which the singer took on the role of team coach Lomza. On August 23 the promotional video for the edition was premiered. Jula's team was knocked out of the 13 October in the sixth episode, taking fifth place.

Awards and nominations
Eska Music Awards
Won: "Best Eska Artist"
Won: "Best Debuting Artist"
Nominated: "Best Hit" for single "Za każdym razem"
Nominated: "Best Actress"
TOPtrendy
Won (2012): "Internet Award" / "Audience Award" / Radio RMF MAXXX Award 
Nominated (2013): "Best Hit of Year" for single "Nie zatrzymasz mnie"

Discography

Albums

Singles

Music videos

References

External links
Official website
Facebook

1991 births
Living people
People from Łomża
Polish pop singers
Polish rock singers
21st-century Polish singers
21st-century Polish women singers